Tasbeha (a transliteration of the Arabic word for "praise") is the Midnight Praise of the Coptic Orthodox Church. The Praise consists of various canticles directly from the Holy Bible, known in the Coptic language as a "Hoos", as well as other praises that vary by day of the week. As its name suggests, the Midnight Praise typically happens late at night, preceding a liturgy in the morning. Outside the monasteries, this usually only happens on Saturday night followed by the Sunday liturgy, and often happens in the evening though not necessarily at midnight. In monasteries the Midnight praise usually occurs every night, often in the early hours before dawn. It typically lasts from 90 minutes to 2 hours.

Structure 
After praying the Agpeya, Tasbeha begins with the hymn known as Ten Theno which calls on God to awaken us from our slumber so that we may praise Him fittingly. The Sunday Tasbeha (that occurs on Saturday night) then proceeds with 4 "Hoos"-es or canticles. Each canticle is sung directly from the Bible, followed by a "Lobsh" or explanation hymn.

The first canticle is the Song of Moses.
The second canticle or hoos is Psalm 135, which thanks God for "His mercy [that] endures forever".
The third canticle is the praise of the Three Holy Children (Daniel 3:26-56), followed by the Greek hymn Aripsaleen.
After some additional hymns, doxologies, and commemorations of the saints, the fourth canticle is sung, which consists of Psalms 148, 149, and 150.

Tasbeha continues with the Psalm of the day, glorifications of St. Mary that intricately explore the various symbols of the Virgin and Christ's incarnation present in the Old Testament, and the reading of the Gospel and Antiphonarium. Tasbeha concludes with the Creed, praise of God for His mercy, the prayer "Holy Holy Holy" and, if a priest is present, the Midnight Absolution.

Symbolism 
Tasbeha is often regarded by Copts as the closest time to Heaven on Earth in that the community joins with the angels in the heavenly praise of God.

References

External links
Tasbeha.org

Coptic Orthodox Church